Pine Grove Community Church is a historic non-denominational, Christian chapel located at Pine Grove in Lewis County, New York. It was built in 1895 and is a two-story, wood-frame building three bays in width and five bays deep. It features a projecting two storybell tower attached to the center of the main block.

It was listed on the National Register of Historic Places in 2009.

References

Churches on the National Register of Historic Places in New York (state)
Churches completed in 1895
19th-century churches in the United States
Churches in Lewis County, New York
National Register of Historic Places in Lewis County, New York
1895 establishments in New York (state)